The following outline is provided as an overview of and topical guide to immunology:

Immunology is the study of all aspects of the immune system in all organisms. It deals with the physiological functioning of the immune system in states of both health and disease; malfunctions of the immune system in immunological disorders (autoimmune diseases, hypersensitivities, immune deficiency, transplant rejection); the physical, chemical and physiological characteristics of the components of the immune system in vitro, in situ, and in vivo.

Essence of immunology 

Immunology
 Branch of Biomedical science
 Immune system
 Immunity

 Branches of immunology:
1. General Immunology
2. Basic Immunology
3. Advanced Immunology
4. Medical Immunology
5. Pharmaceutical Immunology
9. Clinical Immunology
6. Environmental Immunology
8. Cellular and Molecular Immunology
9. Food and Agricultural Immunology

 Classical immunology
 Clinical immunology
 Computational immunology
 Diagnostic immunology
 Evolutionary immunology
 Systems immunology
 Immunomics
 Immunoproteomics
 Immunophysics
 Immunochemistry
 Ecoimmunology
 Immunopathology
 Nutritional immunology
 Psychoneuroimmunology
 Reproductive immunology
 Circadian immunology
 Immunotoxicology
 Palaeoimmunology
 Tissue-based immunology
 Testicular immunology - Testes
 Immunodermatology - Skin
 Intravascular immunology - Blood
 Osteoimmunology - Bone
 Mucosal immunology - Mucosal surfaces
 Respiratory tract antimicrobial defense system - Respiratory tract
 Neuroimmunology - Neuroimmune system in the Central nervous system
 Ocularimmunology - Ocular immune system in the Eye
 Cancer immunology/Immunooncology - Tumors

History of immunology 

History of immunology
 Timeline of immunology

General immunological concepts 
 Immunity:
 Immunity against:
 Pathogens
 Pathogenic bacteria
 Viruses
 Fungi
 Protozoa
 Parasites
 Tumors
 Allergens
 Self-proteins
 Autoimmunity
 Alloimmunity
 Cross-reactivity
 Tolerance
 Central tolerance
 Peripheral tolerance
 Clonal anergy
 Clonal deletion
 Tolerance in pregnancy
 Immunodeficiency
 Antigen
 Antigenicity
 Immunogen
 Superantigen
 Allergen
 Hapten
 Epitope
 Linear
 Conformational
 Mimotope
 Tumor antigen
 Antigen-antibody interaction
 Immunogenetics
 Affinity maturation
 Somatic hypermutation
 Clonal selection
 V(D)J recombination
 Artemis complex
 Recombination-activating gene
 RAG1
 RAG2
 Recombination signal sequences
 Junctional diversity
 Immunoglobulin class switching
 Allelic exclusion
 Polyclonal response
 Phagocytosis
 Opsonin
 Intrinsic immunity
 Leukocyte extravasation
 Cross-presentation
 Immune repertoire
 Original antigenic sin
 Antigen presentation
 Immunological synapse
 Co-stimulation

Components of the immune system 

Immune system

Adaptive immune system

Adaptive immune system
 Humoral immunity
 Antibodies
 Kinds of antibodies
 Monoclonal antibodies
 Polyclonal antibodies
 Autoantibody
 Microantibody
 Neutralizing antibody
 Classification
 Allotype
 Isotype
 Idiotype
 Functions
 Antibody opsonization
 Neutralisation
 Regions
 Paratope
 Complementarity-determining region (CDRs)
 Hypervariable region
 Framework region
 Fab Region
 Fc Region
 Polyclonal B cell response
 Cell-mediated immunity

Innate immune system

Innate immune system
 Complement system
 Classical complement pathway
 Mannan-binding lectin pathway
 Alternate complement pathway
 Complement membrane attack complex
Surface barriers – Physical or chemical barriers that prevent infection (i.e. skin, tears, mucus, saliva, Gastric acid, etc.)
Antimicrobial peptides
Defensins
Lysozyme
 Inflammation
 Inflammatory reflex
 Inflammasome
 Granuloma
 Acute-phase proteins
 Amyloid

 SAP
 SAA

 Positive

 Alpha 1-antichymotrypsin
 Alpha 1-antitrypsin 
 Alpha 2-macroglobulin 
 C-reactive protein 
 Ceruloplasmin
 C3 
 Ferritin 
 Fibrin 
 Haptoglobin 
 Hemopexin 
 Orosomucoid

 Negative

 Serum albumin 
 Transferrin

Organs of the immune system 

Lymphatic system

Primary lymphoid organs 

Primary lymphoid organs
 Thymus - Site of T cell maturation
 Bone marrow - Site of haematopoiesis and B cell maturation

Secondary lymphoid organs 

Secondary lymphoid organs
 Spleen
 White pulp
 Red pulp
 Marginal zone
 Lymph nodes
 Mucosa-associated lymphoid tissue
 Gut-associated lymphoid tissue
 Bronchus-associated lymphoid tissue

Cells of the immune system 

White blood cells

Myeloid cells 

 Granulocytes
 Neutrophils
 Eosinophils
 Basophils
Mast cells
 Monocytes
 Macrophages
 Histiocytes (Tissue resident macrophages)
 Adipose tissue macrophages
 Kupffer cell - Liver
 Alveolar macrophage (Dust cell) - Lung
 Langerhans cell - Skin
 Dermal macrophage - Dermis
 Microglia - CNS
 Perivascular macrophage
 Meningeal macrophage - Meninges
 Hofbauer cell - Placenta
 Osteoclasts - Bone
 Bone marrow macrophage - Bone marrow
 Marginal zone macrophage - Spleen
 Metallophilic macrophage - Spleen
 Red pulp macrophage - Splenic red pulp
 Tingible body macrophage (White pulp macrophage) - Splenic white pulp
 Giant cells
 Foreign-body giant cell
 Langhans giant cell
 Touton giant cells
 Epithelioid cells
 Bone marrow-derived macrophages - Generated in vitro
Dendritic Cells
Conventional Dendritic Cells
Plasmacytoid dendritic cells

Lymphoid cells 

Lymphoid cells
 B cells
 Plasma B cells
 Memory B cells
 B-1 cells
 B-2 cells (the conventional B cells most texts refer to)
 Marginal-zone B cells
 Follicular B cells
 T cells
 Naive T cells
 Helper T cells - Commonly termed CD4+ T cells
 Th1 cells
 Th2 cells
 Th3 cells
 Th17 cells
 TFH cells - Follicular helper T cells
 Cytotoxic T cells - Commonly termed CD8+ T cells
 Memory T cells
 Regulatory T cells
 Natural Killer T cells (NKT cells)
 γδ T cells
 Mucosal associated invariant T cells
 Innate lymphoid cells (ILC)
 Group 1 ILC
 Natural killer cells (NK cells)
 Group 2 ILC
 Nuocyte
 Group 3 ILC
 Lymphoid Tissue inducer cells (LTi cells)

Others 
(Non-hematopoietic cells with immune functions)
 Stromal cells
 Lymph node stromal cells
 Follicular dendritic cells
 Epithelial cells
 Pericytes
 Microfold cells (M cells)

Hematopoiesis 

 Lymphopoiesis
 Lymphoblast
 Prolymphocyte
 T cell development
 Thymocyte
 B cell development
 Pre-pro-B cell
 Early pro-B cell
 Late pro-B cell
 Large pre-B cell
 Small pre-B cell
 Immature B cell
 Myelopoiesis
 Common myeloid progenitor (CFU-GEMM)
 Granulocyte-macrophage progenitor (CFU-GM)
 Granulopoiesis
 Myeloblast (CFU-G)
 Promyelocyte
 Myelocyte
 Metamyelocyte
 Band cell
 Monocytopoiesis
 Monoblast (CFU-M)
 CFU-DL - Dendritic cell / Langerhans cell precursor
 Promonocyte
 CFU-Baso (Basophil precursor)
 CFU-Eos (Eosinophil precursor)
 Megakaryocyte-erythroid progenitor cell (MEP)
 Megakaryocytopoiesis
 CFU-Meg
 Megakaryoblast
 Promegakaryocyte
 Megakaryocyte
 Thrombopoiesis
 Thrombocyte (Platelets)
 Erythropoiesis
 Proerythroblast
 Normoblast
 Reticulocyte
 CFU-Mast
 Mast cell precursors

Molecules of the immune system

Immune receptors

Antigen receptors 
 B cells
 Antigen receptor - B cell receptor (BCR)
 Subunits- Immunoglobulin heavy chain / Immunoglobulin light chain
 Co-receptors
 Stimulatory
 CD21
 CD19
 CD81
 Inhibitory
 CD22
 Accessory molecule (CD79)
 Ig-α (CD79A)
 Ig-β (CD79B) 
 T cells
 Antigen receptor - T cell receptor (TCR)
 Subunits - TRA@ / TRB@ / TRD@ / TRG@
 Co-receptors
 CD8 (CD8α / CD8β)
 CD4
 Accessory molecules
 CD3
 Subunits - one CD3γ / one CD3δ / two CD3ε
 ζ-chain (CD247, CD3ζ, TCRζ)

Pattern recognition receptors (PRRs) 

Pattern recognition receptor

 Membrane-bound PRRs
 Toll-like receptors (TLRs)

 TLR1
 TLR2
 TLR3
 TLR4
 TLR5
 TLR6
 TLR7
 TLR8
 TLR9
 TLR10
 TLR11
 TLR12
 TLR13

 C-type lectin receptors (CLRs)  

 Group 1 CLRs - Mannose receptors

 MRC1
 MRC2
 DEC205 (CD205)

 Group 2 CLRs - Asialoglycoprotein receptor family

 DC-SIGN (CD209)
 Langerin (CD207)
 CLEC10A (CD301, MGL)
 CLEC5A (MDL1)

 Dectin 1 subfamily

 Dectin 1 (CLEC7A)
 MICL (CLEC12A)
 CLEC2
 DNGR1 (CLEC9A)

 DCIR subfamily

 Dectin 2 (CLEC6A)
 BDCA2 (CD303)
 Mincle (CLEC4E)
 DCIR (CLEC4A)

 Scavenger receptors
 Class A - Trimers

 MSR1 (SCARA1)
 MARCO (SCARA2)
 SCARA3
 SCARA4 (COLEC12)
 SCARA5

 Class B - Two transmembrane domains

 SCARB1
 SCARB2
 CD36 (SCARB3)

 Others

 CD68
 LOX-1

 Formyl peptide receptors (FPRs)

 FPR1
 FPR2
 FPR3

 Cytoplasmic PRRs
 NOD-like receptors (NLRs)
 NLRA (A for acidic transactivating domain)
 CIITA
 NLRB (B for BIR, or Inhibitor of apoptosis domain)
 NAIP
 NLRC (C for CARD domain)

 NOD1
 NOD2
 NLRC3
 NLRC4 (IPAF)
 NLRC5

 NLRP (P for Pyrin domain)

 NLRP1
 NLRP2
 NLRP3
 NLRP4
 NLRP5 
 NLRP6 
 NLRP7 
 NLRP8 
 NLRP9 
 NLRP10 
 NLRP11 
 NLRP12
 NLRP13
 NLRP14

 NLRX
 NLRX1
 RIG-I-like receptors (RLRs) - Intracellular sensors of viral replication by direct interaction with dsRNA

 RIG-I
 MDA5
 LGP2

 Secreted PRRs
 Complement system (see complement proteins section)
 Collectins

 Mannan-binding lectin (MBL)
 Surfactant protein A (SP-A)
 Surfactant protein D (SP-D)
 CL-L1
 CL-P1
 CL-K1

 Peptidoglycan recognition proteins (PGRPs)

 PGLYRP1
 PGLYRP2
 PGLYRP3
 PGLYRP4

 Ficolins

 FCN1
 FCN2
 FCN3

Complement receptors 

Complement receptor
 CR1 (CD35)
 CR2 (CD21)
 CR3 - Heterodimer: CD11b / CD18
 CR4 - Heterodimer: CD11c / CD18
 CRIg (Complement receptor of the immunoglobulin family)
 Anaphylatoxin receptors
 C3a receptor
 C5a receptor (CD88)
 C5AR2

Fc receptors 

Fc receptor

 Fc-gamma receptors (FcγR)
 FcγRI (CD64)
 FcγRIIA (CD32A)
 FcγRIIB (CD32B)
 FcγRIIIA (CD16a)
 FcγRIIIB (CD16b)
 FcγRT (Neonatal Fc receptor)
 Fc-alpha receptors (FcαR)
 FcαRI (CD89, FCAR)
 Fcα/μR
 Fc-epsilon receptors (FcεR)
 FcεRI - Tetramer: FCER1A / FCER1B / two FCER1G
 FcεRII (CD23)
 Secreted Fc receptors
 Polymeric immunoglobulin receptor (poly-Ig)
 Fc receptor-like molecules

Cytokine receptors 

Cytokine receptor

 Type I cytokine receptors (Hemopoietin receptors) - Share extracellular WSXWS motif, Grouped by common receptor subunits
Common gamma chain (γ-chain, CD132)
 IL2R - Heterotrimer: IL2RA (CD25) / IL2RB (CD122) / γc
 IL4R / IL13R - Heterodimer: IL4RA / (IL13RA1/IL13RA2)
 IL7R - Heterodimer: IL7RA (CD127) / γ-chain
 IL9R - Heterodimer: IL9R / γ-chain
 IL15R - Heterotrimer: IL15RA / IL2RB / γ-chain
 IL21R - Heterodimer: IL21R / γ-chain
Common beta chain (β-chain, CD131)
 IL3R - Heterodimer: IL3RA / β-chain
 IL5R - Heterodimer: IL5RA / β-chain
 GM-CSFR (CD116) - Heterdimer: GM-CSFRA / β-chain
 Common gp130 subunit (gp130, CD130)
 IL6R - Heterodimer: IL6RA / gp130
 IL11R - Heterodimer: IL11RA / gp130
 IL27R - Heterodimer: IL27RA / gp130
 OSMR - Heterodimer: OSMR / gp130
 LIFR (CD118) - Heterodimer: LIFR / gp130
 IL12 receptor beta 1 subunit (IL12RB1)
 IL12R - Heterodimer: IL12RB1 / IL12RB2
 IL23R - Heterodimer: IL23RA / IL12RB1
 Others
 EPOR (Erythropoietin receptor) - Homodimer
 G-CSFR (CD114) - Homodimer upon ligand binding
 MPL (CD110, Thrombopoietin receptor) - Homodimer upon ligand binding
 GHR (Growth hormone receptor) - Homodimer upon ligand binding
 PRLR (Prolactin receptor)
 Type II cytokine receptor - Lack WSXWS motif
 Interferon receptors
 Interferon-α/β receptor (IFNAR) - Heterodimer: IFNAR1 / IFNAR2
 Interferon-γ receptor (IFNGR) - Heterodimer: IFNGR1 / IFNGR2
 Interleukin receptors
 IL10R - Heterodimer: IL10RA / IL10RB
 IL20R - Heterodimer: IL20RA / IL20RB
 IL22R - Heterodimer: IL22RA1 / IL10RB
 IL28R - Heterodimer: IL28RA / IL10RB
 Immunoglobulin superfamily (Some members)
 CSF1
 CD117 (c-KIT)
 IL1 receptor family (IL1R)
 IL1R type 1 (CD121a)
 IL1R type 2 (CD121b)
 IL1R accessory protein (IL1RAP)
 IL1RL1 (IL33R, ST2)
 IL18R - Heterodimer: IL18R1 / IL18RAP
 IL17 family
 IL17RA
 IL17RB
 IL17RC
 IL17RD
 IL17RE
 Tumor necrosis factor (TNF) receptor family - Trimeric cytokine receptors

 TNFRSF1A (CD120a)
 TNFRSF1B (CD120b)
 TNFRSF3 (Lymphotoxin βR)
 TNFRSF4 (CD134, OX40)
 TNFRSF5 (CD40)
 TNFRSF6 (FAS)

 TNFRSF6B
 TNFRSF7 (CD27)
 TNFRSF8 (CD30)
 TNFRSF9 (CD137)
 TNFRSF10A (CD261)
 TNFRSF10B (CD262)

 TNFRSF10C (CD263)
 TNFRSF10D (CD264)
 TNFRSF11A (CD265, RANK)
 TNFRSF11B (Osteoprotegerin)
 TNFRSF12A (CD266)
 TNFRSF13B (CD267)

 TNFRSF13C
 TNFRSF14 (CD268)
 TNFRSF16 (LNGRF)
 TNFRSF17 (CD269)
 TNFRSF18
 TNFRSF19

 TNFRSF21
 TNFRSF25
 TNFRSF27

 Chemokine receptors - 7-transmembrane G protein-coupled receptors
 CC chemokine receptors (CCRs)

 CCR1
 CCR2

 CCR3
 CCR4

 CCR5
 CCR6

 CCR7
 CCR8

 CCR9
 CCR10

 CXC chemokine receptors (CXCRs)

 CXCR1
 CXCR2

 CXCR3
 CXCR4

 CXCR5

 CXCR6

 CXCR7

 C chemokine receptors (XCRs)
 XCR1
 CX3C chemokine receptors (CX3CRs)
 CX3CR1 (Fractalkine receptor)
 TGF beta receptors - Single transmembrane pass serine/threonine kinase receptors
 TGFBR1
 TGFBR2
 TGFBR3

Natural killer cell receptors 

Natural killer cell receptors
 Killer activation receptors (KARs)
 Natural cytotoxicity receptors (NCRs)

 NCR1
 NCR2
 NCR3

 Natural killer group 2 receptors (NKG2s)

 NKG2A
 NKG2B
 NKG2C
 NKG2D
 NKG2E
 NKG2H

 Activating KIRs
 KIR2DS1
 Killer inhibitory receptors (KIRs)
 Two domains, long cytoplasmic tail

 KIR2DL1
 KIR2DL2
 KIR2DL3
 KIR2DL4
 KIR2DL5A
 KIR2DL5B

 Two domains, short cytoplasmic tail

 KIR2DS1
 KIR2DS2
 KIR2DS3
 KIR2DS4
 KIR2DS5

 Three domains, long cytoplasmic tail

 KIR3DL1
 KIR3DL2
 KIR3DL3

 Three domains, short cytoplasmic tail
 KIR3DS1

Others 
 Leukocyte immunoglobulin-like receptors (LILRs)
 LILR subfamily A

 LILRA1
 LILRA2
 LILRA3
 LILRA4
 LILRA5
 LILRA6

 LILR subfamily B

 LILRB1
 LILRB2
 LILRB3
 LILRB4
 LILRB5

 Eicosanoid receptors

Antibodies 

Antibodies
 Immunoglobulin A (IgA) 
 IgA1
 IgA2
 Immunoglobulin D (IgD)
 Immunoglobulin E (IgE)
 Immunoglobulin G (IgG)
 IgG1
 IgG2
 IgG3
 IgG4
 Immunoglobulin M (IgM)

Cytokines 

Cytokine

 Chemokines

 CC chemokines

 CCL1
 CCL2
 CCL3
 CCL4
 CCL5
 CCL6

 CCL7
 CCL8
 CCL9/CCL10
 CCL11
 CCL12
 CCL13

 CCL14
 CCL15
 CCL16
 CCL17
 CCL18

 CCL19
 CCL20
 CCL21
 CCL22
 CCL23

 CCL24
 CCL25
 CCL26
 CCL27
 CCL28

 CXC chemokines

 CXCL1
 CXCL2
 CXCL3
 CXCL4

 CXCL5
 CXCL6
 CXCL7
 CXCL8

 CXCL9
 CXCL10
 CXCL11

 CXCL12
 CXCL13
 CXCL14

 CXCL15
 CXCL16
 CXCL17

 C chemokines
 XCL1
 XCL2
 CX3C chemokines
 CX3CL1 (Fractalkine, Neurotactin)
 Interferons
 Interferon type I
 IFN-α 
 IFN-β 
 IFN-ω 
 Interferon type II
 IFN-γ
 Interleukins

 IL1A
 IL1B
 IL1RA
 IL2
 IL3
 IL4
 IL5
 IL6
 IL7
 IL8

 IL9
 IL10
 IL11
 IL12
 IL13
 IL14
 IL15
 IL16
 IL17A
 IL17F

 IL18
 IL19
 IL20
 IL21
 IL22
 IL23
 IL24
 IL25
 IL26

 IL27
 IL28A
 IL28B
 IL29
 IL30
 IL31
 IL32
 IL33
 IL34

 IL35
 IL36A
 IL36B
 IL36G
 IL36RA
 IL37
 TSLP
 LIF (Leukemia inhibitory factor)
 OSM (Oncostatin M)

 Tumor necrosis factors

 TNFA
 TNFB (Lymphotoxin-α)
 TNFC (Lymphotoxin-β)
 TNFSF4 (OX40L)

 TNFSF5 (CD40L)
 TNFSF6 (FasL)
 TNFSF7 (CD70, CD27L)
 TNFSF8 (CD153, CD30L)

 TNFSF9 (4-1BBL)
 TNFSF10 (TRAIL)
 TNFSF11 (RANK-L, OPG-L)
 TNFSF12 (TWEAK)

 TNFSF13 (APRIL, CD256)
 TNFSF13B (BAFF, CD257)
 TNFSF14 (LIGHT, CD258)

 TNFSF15 (VEGI)
 TNFSF18
 EDA

 Colony stimulating factors
 CSF1 (M-CSF)
 CSF2 (GM-CSF)
 CSF3 (G-CSF)

MHCs 

Major histocompatibility complex

 MHC class I

 HLA-A
 HLA-B
 HLA-C
 HLA-E
 HLA-F
 HLA-G

MHC class II

 HLA-DM
 α
 β
 HLA-DO
 α
 β
 HLA-DP
 α1
 β1
 HLA-DQ
 α1
 α2
 β1
 β2
 β3
 HLA-DR
 α
 β1
 β3
 β4
 β5

Complement proteins 
 Early stage (divided by pathway)
 Classical complement pathway
 C1Q complex - C1R / C1S
 C4 - C4a
 C2
 Mannan-binding lectin pathway
 MASP1 / MASP2
 Mannan-binding lectin
 Alternative complement pathway
 Factor B
 Factor D
 Factor P (Properdin)
 Middle stage
 C3 - C3a / C3b / iC3b
 C5 - C5a
 C3-convertase
 C5-convertase
 Late stage
 Membrane attack complex (MAC)
 C6
 C7
 C8
 C9
 Complement pathway inhibitors
 C1-inhibitor - Classical, Lectin, Alternate
 Decay-accelerating factor (CD59) - Classical, Lectin, Alternate
 Factor I - Classical, Lectin, Alternate
 C4BP - Classical, Lectin
 Factor H - Alternate

Antimicrobial peptides 

Antimicrobial peptides

Transcription factors 
 NF-κB
 AP-1
 Interferon regulatory factors (IRF)
 NFAT

 T-bet - TH1 differentiation
 GATA3 - TH2 differentiation
 RORγT - TH17 differentiation
 BCL6 - TFH differentiation
 FoxP3 - Treg differentiation

Signaling pathways 
 JAK-STAT signaling pathway

 TGF beta signaling pathway
 TLR signalling pathway

Cell adhesion molecules (CAMs) 

Cell adhesion molecules

 Integrins - Obligate heterodimers of one alpha and one beta subunits
 Alpha subunits

 Beta subunits

 Dimers
 Cytoadhesin receptor
 Integrin alpha6beta4 
 Glycoprotein IIb/IIIa - Heterodimer: ITGA2B / ITGB3
 Fibrinogen receptor	
 Macrophage-1 antigen (CR3) - Heterodimer:  CD11b / CD18
 Fibronectin receptor:	
 Integrin alpha2beta1
 Integrin alpha4beta1 
 Integrin alpha5beta1
 Leukocyte-adhesion receptor:	
 LFA-1 - Heterodimer: CD11a / CD18 
 Macrophage-1 antigen (CR3) - Heterodimer: CD11b / CD18 
 Integrin alphaXbeta2 (CR4) - Heterodimer:  CD11c / CD18
 Very late antigen receptor:	
 Integrin alpha1beta1 
 Integrin alpha2beta1 
 Integrin alpha3beta1 
 VLA-4 - Heterodimer: CD49d / CD29 
 Alpha-5 beta-1 
 Integrin alpha6beta1
 Vitronectin receptor:	
 Alpha-v beta-3 
 Alpha-v beta-5
 Immunoglobulin superfamily CAMs
 SynCAMs - Synaptic cell adhesion molecules
 NCAMs - Neural cell adhesion molecules
 Intercellular adhesion molecules (ICAMs)

 VCAM-1 (CD106)
 PECAM-1 (CD31)
 L1 family

 SIGLEC family - Sialic acid binding lectins

 CTX family

 Nectins

 CD2 family
 CD2
 CD58
 Signaling lymphocytic activation molecules (SLAMs)

 Cadherins
 Selectins
 E-selectin
 L-selectin
 P-selectin
 Others
 Lymphocyte homing receptors
 CD34
 GLYCAM-1
 Addressin (MAdCAM-1)
 CD44
 Carcinoembryonic antigens

 CD24
 CD44
 CD146
 CD164

Others 
 CD69
 Sphingosine-1-phosphate receptors

 Co-stimulatory molecules
 CD80 - Expressed by APCs
 CD86 - Expressed by APCs
 CD28 family receptors
 CD28 - Expressed by T Cells
 CD278 (ICOS) - Homodimer, expressed by T Cells
 CTLA-4 (CD152)
 PD-1 (CD279)

Immune system disorders 

Immune disorder

Hypersensitivity and Allergy 

 Type 1 hypersensitivity / Allergy / Atopy
 Foreign (Allergen)
 Atopic eczema
 Allergic urticaria
 Allergic rhinitis (Hay fever)
 Allergic asthma
 Anaphylaxis
 Food allergy
 Milk allergy
 Egg allergy
 Peanut allergy
 Tree nut allergy
 Seafood allergy
 Soy allergy
 Wheat allergy
 Garlic allergy
 Penicillin allergy

 Type 2 hypersensitivity / Antibody-dependent cell-mediated cytotoxicity (ADCC)
 Foreign
 Pernicious anemia
 Hemolytic disease of the newborn
 Autoimmune
 Cytotoxic
 Autoimmune hemolytic anemia
 Idiopathic thrombocytopenic purpura
 Bullous pemphigoid
 Pemphigus vulgaris
 Rheumatic fever
 Goodpasture's syndrome
 Type 5 / Receptor mediated
 Graves' disease
 Myasthenia gravis
 Type 3 hypersensitivity / Immune complex
 Foreign
 Henoch–Schönlein purpura
 Hypersensitivity vasculitis 
 Reactive arthritis 
 Farmer's lung 
 Post-streptococcal glomerulonephritis 
 Serum sickness 
 Arthus reaction
 Autoimmune
 Systemic lupus erythematosus
 Subacute bacterial endocarditis 
 Rheumatoid arthritis
 Type 4 hypersensitivity (Delayed-Type Hypersensitivity)
 Foreign
 Allergic contact dermatitis
 Mantoux test
 Autoimmune
 Diabetes mellitus type 1 
 Hashimoto's thyroiditis 
 Guillain–Barré syndrome 
 Multiple sclerosis 
 Coeliac disease 
 Giant-cell arteritis
 GVHD (Graft-versus-host disease)
 Transfusion-associated graft versus host disease
 Unknown/Multiple types
 Foreign
 Hypersensitivity pneumonitis 
 Allergic bronchopulmonary aspergillosis 
 Transplant rejection 
 Latex allergy (I+IV)
 Autoimmune
 Sjögren's syndrome
 Autoimmune hepatitis 
 Autoimmune polyendocrine syndrome (APS1 / APS2)
 Autoimmune adrenalitis 
 Systemic autoimmune disease

Immunodeficiency 

Immunodeficiency

 Primary immunodeficiency
 Acquired immunodeficiency
 Complement deficiency

Cancers of the immune system

Myeloid diseases

Inflammatory diseases 
 Sepsis
 Inflammatory bowel disease (IBD)
 Cytokine storm

Immunoproliferative immunoglobulin disorders 

Immunoproliferative immunoglobulin disorders

Lymphatic organ disease

Immunologic techniques and tests 
 Flow cytometry
 Mass cytometry
 Histology
 Adoptive cell transfer
 Experiments in immunology
 Genetically modified mouse
 Immunofluorescence
 Immunofixation
 Immunoadsorption
 MHC multimer
 Hybridoma technology
 Rabbit hybridoma
 Developmental studies hybridoma bank

Immunology and health 
 Prevention
 Immunostimulants
 Immunotherapy
 Activation immunotherapy
 Cancer immunotherapy
 Autologous immune enhancement therapy
 Immunosuppression
 Sublingual immunotherapy
 Allergen immunotherapy
 Immunosuppressive drug

 Artificial induction of immunity
 Immunization
 Active immunotherapy
 Passive immunity
 Temporarily induced immunity
 Adoptive immunity
 Vaccination
 Vaccine-naive
 Vaccine
 Herd immunity
 Adjuvant

 Organ transplantation
 Allotransplant
 Transplant rejection

Immunologists 

List of immunologists

Immunology lists 
 List of autoimmune diseases
 List of immunologists
 List of viruses
 List of human clusters of differentiation
 List of vaccine ingredients
 List of allergens
 List of cytokines
 List of cytokine receptors
 List of pattern recognition receptors
 List of tissue-resident macrophages
 List of branches of immunology
 List of acute-phase proteins

References

External links 

 BMC: Immunology- BioMed Central:Immunology is an open access journal publishing original peer-reviewed research articles.
 Nature Reviews Immunology ( journal home)
 Janeway's Immunobiology textbook Searchable free online version at the National Center for Biotechnology Information
 Overview at Medical College of Georgia
 MUGEN NoE murine models for immunological disease
 Transplantation Immunology Interesting web site made by the faculty of medicine of the University of Geneva dealing with the immunological issues linked with the transplantation of materials genetically different between donor and recipient (hematopoietical stem cells, organs or the transfusion of blood).
 Online lectures in immunology University of South Carolina
 BRT-Burleson Research Technologies Tests the effects of pharmaceuticals in the developmental stage on the immune system.

Immunology

 
 
Immunology
Immunology